The 2010–11 Ascenso MX season is the second season of the Liga de Ascenso, the second-level football league of Mexico. It consists of two separate tournaments, the Apertura and the Clausura. The winners of both tournaments will meet in a playoff to determine the team being promoted to the 2011–12 Primera Division de Mexico season.

The Apertura tournament began on July, 16th 2010 with the first matches of the classification phase and ended on December, 4th 2010 with the Apertura Liguilla final. The final was won by Tijuana, who defeated Veracruz 3–0 on aggregate.

The Clausura tournament began on January, 7th 2011 and ended on May, 14th 2011. The final was won by Irapuato, who defeated Tijuana. The following week, Apertura champion Tijuana defeated Clausura champion Irapuato in a playoff to determine the team promoted to the 2011–12 Liga MX season. That playoff took place on 18 May 2011 and May, 21st 2011.

Changes for the 2010–2011 season

 Altamira won promotion from Segunda División de México.
 There was no demotion to Segunda División
 Indios was demoted from Primera Division de Mexico
 Necaxa won promotion to Primera División.
 Potros Neza was rebranded Atlante UTN
 Guerreros de Hermosillo were suspended after the 2010 Apertura for not paying players.

Stadia and locations

Apertura

Standings

Results

Apertura Liguilla

 If the two teams are tied after both legs, the higher seeded team advances.
 Teams are re-seeded every round.
 The winner will qualify to the playoff match vs the Clausura 2011 winner. However, if the winner is Tijuana, they are the team promoted to the 2011–12 Primera Division de Mexico season without playing the Promotional Final

Quarter-finals

First leg

Second leg

Semi-finals

First leg

Second leg

Final

First leg

Second leg

Top goalscorers
Source: FeMexFut

Clausura

Standings

Results

Clausura Liguilla

 If the two teams are tied after both legs, the higher seeded team advances.
 Teams are re-seeded every round.
 The winner will qualify to the playoff match vs Club Tijuana (the Apertura 2010 winner). However, if the winner is Tijuana, they are the team promoted to the 2011–12 Mexican Primera División season without playing the Promotional Final.

Quarter-finals

First leg

Second leg

Semi-finals

First leg

Second leg

Final

First leg

Second leg

Promotional Final

First Leg

Second leg

References

 Calendario Oficial Apertura 2010
 Calendario Oficial Clausura 2011

External links
Official Website

2010–11 domestic association football leagues
2
2010-11